Don José Nicolás de Azara y Perera (5 December 173026 January 1804) was a Spanish diplomat.

Life

He was born at Barbunales, Aragon, and was appointed in 1765 Spanish agent and procurator-general, and in 1785 ambassador at Rome. During his long residence there he distinguished himself as a collector of Italian antiquities and as a patron of art. He was a follower of Johann Joachim Winckelmann and bought the posthumous portrait painted as a memorial to him by Mengs. Some of the items in his collection came from excavations he conducted near Rome.

He was also an able and active diplomat, took a lead part in the difficult and hazardous task of the expulsion of the Jesuits from Spain, and was instrumental in securing the election of Pope Pius VI. Azara was the Pope's representative during the negotiations with France for the Armistice of Bologna.  He withdrew to Florence when the French took possession of Rome in 1798, but acted on behalf of the pope during his exile and after his death at Valence in 1799.

He was afterwards Spanish ambassador in Paris. In that post it was his misfortune to be forced by his government to conduct the negotiations which led to the Treaty of San Ildefonso, by which Spain was wholly subjected to Napoleon. Azara was friendly to a French alliance, but his experience showed him that his country was being sacrificed to Napoleon. The First Consul liked him personally, and found him easy to influence. Azara died, worn out, in Paris in 1804. His end was undoubtedly embittered by his discovery of the ills which the French alliance must produce for Spain.

Several sympathetic notices of Azara will be found in Thiers, Consulat et Empire. See also Reinado de Carles IV, by Gen. J. Gomez de Arteche, in the Historia General dc Espana, published by the R. Acad. de Ia Historia, Madrid, 1892, &c. There is a Notice historique sur le Chevalier d'Azara by his friend Bourgoing (1804).

His younger brother Félix de Azara (1746–1821) was a noted naturalist in South America.

References

Bibliography

 

Attribution

External links 
José Nicolás de Azara. Polymath Virtual Library, Fundación Ignacio Larramendi

1730 births
1804 deaths
People from Somontano de Barbastro
Spanish diplomats
Spanish collectors
Members of the Göttingen Academy of Sciences and Humanities